Sinhá Moça is a Brazilian telenovela produced and displayed at the time of 18 hours (6:00 PM, or 6 in the afternoon) by TV Globo, April 28 to November 14, 1986, in 168 chapters. Substitute De Quina pra Lua and be succeeded by Direito de Amar.

Written by Benedito Ruy Barbosa, it is freely inspired by the novel of the same name by Maria Dezonne Pacheco Fernandes, with the collaboration of Edmara Barbosa and Edilene Barbosa and direction of Reynaldo Boury and Jayme Monjardim.

Synopsis 
The story revolves around Sinhá Moça (Lucélia Santos), the rebellious daughter of Colonel Ferreira, the baron of Araruna (Rubens de Falco), who is a ruthless slaveowner, her submissive mother Cândida (Elaine Cristina), and the young Dr. Rodolfo Garcia Fontes (Marcos Paulo), an active Republican abolitionist, before the difficulties of the campaign for the abolition of the slavery.

Pro-slavery Monarchists and anti-slavery Republicans confront themselves in Araruna, a small fictional town in the interior of the state of São Paulo, in 1886, two years before the promulgation of the Lei Áurea.

The two meet on the train, when Sinhá Moça, after finishing her studies in the city of São Paulo, returns to Araruna. Like Rodolfo, she has abolitionist ideas and criticizes her father's attitudes, fighting for blacks. Sinhá Moça, along with Rodolfo and other abolitionists, invades slave quarters at night, freeing the black slaves and giving them to abolitionist associations, which guide them towards freedom.

On the other side of the story is Dimas (Raymundo de Souza) (who is actually the boy Rafael, ex-freed slave) and his stubborn struggle to destroy the Baron, his true father with the slave of the farm Maria das Dores (Dhu Moraes). Before being sold by the Baron, Rafael was a close friend of Sinhá Moça, with whom he spent his childhood. After being emancipated, he takes the name Dimas and becomes the right hand of the typographer Augusto (Luiz Carlos Arutin), a convicted abolitionist, arousing love in Juliana (Luciana Braga), his granddaughter.

Cast

Special participation

References

External links

1986 Brazilian television series debuts
1986 Brazilian television series endings
1986 telenovelas
TV Globo telenovelas
Portuguese-language telenovelas
Television shows based on Brazilian novels
Television shows set in Brazil
Television series set in the 1880s